Light Cavalry is a 1927 German silent film directed by Rolf Randolf and starring Alfons Fryland, André Mattoni, and John Mylong.

The film's sets were designed by the art director Gustav A. Knauer.

Cast

References

Bibliography

External links

1927 films
Films of the Weimar Republic
German silent feature films
Films directed by Rolf Randolf
Phoebus Film films
German black-and-white films
1920s German films